The Cladomorphinae are a subfamily of stick insects in the family Phasmatidae.  This taxon is particularly well represented in the Neotropical region, but records (under review) also exist for Madagascar, Java and the Maluku Islands.

Tribes and Genera
The Phasmida Species File currently (2021) lists seven tribes:

Cladomorphini
Auth. Brunner von Wattenwyl, 1893
 Aplopocranidium Zompro, 2004
 Cladomorphus Gray, 1835
 Hirtuleius Stål, 1875
 Jeremia Redtenbacher, 1908
 Jeremiodes Hennemann & Conle, 2007
 Otocraniella Zompro, 2004
 Xylodus Saussure, 1859

Cladoxerini
Auth. Karny, 1923
 Cladoxerus Peletier de Saint Fargeau & Audinet-Serville, 1828
 Parabactridium Redtenbacher, 1908
 Wattenwylia Piza, 1938

Cranidiini
Auth. Günther, 1953
 monotypic genus Cranidium Westwood, 1843

Haplopodini
Auth. Günther, 1953
 Aploploides Rehn & Hebard, 1938
 Apteroplopus Hennemann, Conle & Perez-Gelabert, 2016
 Cephaloplopus Hennemann, Conle & Perez-Gelabert, 2016
 Diapherodes Gray, 1835
 Haplopus Burmeister, 1838
 Paracranidium Brock, 1998
 Parhaplopus Hennemann, Conle & Perez-Gelabert, 2016
 Venupherodes Hennemann, Conle & Perez-Gelabert, 2016

Hesperophasmatini
Auth. Bradley & Galil, 1977
 Agamemnon (insect) Moxey, 1971
 Hesperophasma Rehn, 1901
 Hypocyrtus Redtenbacher, 1908
 Lamponius Stål, 1875
 Rhynchacris Redtenbacher, 1908
 Sigaruphasma Hennemann, Conle, Perez-Gelabert & Valero, 2020
 Tainophasma Conle, Hennemann & Perez-Gelabert, 2014
 Taraxippus (insect) Moxey, 1971

Pterinoxylini
Auth. Hennemann, Conle & Perez-Gelabert, 2016
 monotypic genus Pterinoxylus Audinet-Serville, 1838

Teruelphasmini
Auth. Yong, 2017
 Guamuhaya Yong, 2017
 Teruelphasma Yong, 2017

References

External Links

Phasmatodea subfamilies